Steven Paul Johnston (born 12 October 1971) is former international motorcycle speedway rider from Australia.

Career
Born in Kalgoorlie, Western Australia, Johnston signed for the Sheffield Tigers for the 1992 British League Division Two season. He left Sheffield to join the Long Eaton Invaders for the 1993 season. While at Long Eaton, Johnston began to put in notable performances including winning the Western Australian Individual Speedway Championship in 1993 and 1996 at the Claremont Speedway and being the European Grasstrack Champion in 1996.

In 1997, he signed for Ipswich Witches for the 1997 Elite League speedway season and averaged nearly 8. 

Oxford Cheetahs recruited him the following season to ride at Oxford Stadium for the 1998 Elite League speedway season and he would spend five consecutive seasons with them including helping them win the 2001 Elite League speedway season.

Johnston went on to win a third Western Australian Individual Speedway Championship and represented the Australia speedway team in two Speedway World Cup finals in 2004 and 2005. 

After the 2002 season with Oxford, Johnston became a journeyman rider by appearing for a different club every year from 2003 to 2010. However, he did have a very successful season in 2007. Initially he was due to ride the whole season on his return to Oxford but after a couple of months Oxford withdrew from the 2007 Elite League speedway season. This forced a move to the Coventry Bees, where he won the league and Knockout Cup double.

Johnston earned a testimonial meeting at Coventry in June 2008, while riding for Ipswich and he had one final season at Somerset Rebels in 2009 before retiring.

Speedway Grand Prix results

References 

1971 births
Living people
People from Kalgoorlie
Australian speedway riders
Belle Vue Aces riders
Birmingham Brummies riders
Coventry Bees riders
Ipswich Witches riders
Lakeside Hammers riders
Long Eaton Invaders riders
Oxford Cheetahs riders
Sheffield Tigers riders
Somerset Rebels riders
Swindon Robins riders
Wolverhampton Wolves riders
Sportsmen from Western Australia